Anisotenes dracontodonta is a species of moth of the family Tortricidae. It is found in New Guinea.

References

Moths described in 1952
Anisotenes
Moths of New Guinea
Taxa named by Alexey Diakonoff